Georgy Yakovlevich Martyniuk (3 March 1940 – 13 February 2014) was a Russian film and theater actor.

Biography 
Born in Orenburg in 1940, he graduated from the Russian Academy of Theatre Arts in 1962. In 2003, he was named People's Artist of Russia.

Personal life
He was married to actress Valentina Markova until his death on 13 February 2014 in Moscow following a long illness at age 73.

Filmography

References

External links
 

1940 births
2014 deaths
People from Orenburg
Russian male film actors
Russian male stage actors
Soviet male television actors
Honored Artists of the RSFSR
Soviet male film actors
Soviet male stage actors
Burials in Troyekurovskoye Cemetery
Russian Academy of Theatre Arts alumni